Every Country's Sun is the ninth studio album by Scottish post-rock band Mogwai. It was released on 1 September 2017 by Rock Action Records in the United Kingdom and Europe, Temporary Residence Limited in the United States, and Spunk Records in Australia.

Overview
In April 2016, guitarist Stuart Braithwaite told The Guardian that the band were writing new songs and would be travelling to the US later in the year to record a new album with Dave Fridmann, who produced Rock Action some 15 years previously. On 25 November, Fridmann announced that the band had started recording the album with him. On 3 March 2017, the band announced that they had completed recording and were mastering the album at Abbey Road Studios. The band announced a worldwide tour to coincide with the release of the album, starting with dates in Europe in October before visiting North America in November, and finally playing in their home city, Glasgow, in December 2017.

On 14 May 2017, the band announced the title and release date of the new album, and also shared the first song "Coolverine". On June 2, Mogwai played a show at Primavera Sound festival in Barcelona, only announced on the day, which consisted of Every Country's Sun played in full.

Track listing
The deluxe version contains the album on CD and LP, along with a bonus 12-inch vinyl containing six previously unreleased demos.

Personnel
Credits adapted from the liner notes of Every Country's Sun.

 Frank Arkwright – mastering
 DLT – design, illustration
 Matt Estep – mixing assistance, production assistance
 Dave Fridmann – mixing, production

Charts

References

2017 albums
Mogwai albums
Rock Action Records albums
Temporary Residence Limited albums
Albums produced by Dave Fridmann
Albums recorded at Tarbox Road Studios